Nina Stadlinger (born 22 April 1980) is an Austrian equestrian. She competed in two events at the 2004 Summer Olympics.

References

External links
 

1980 births
Living people
Austrian female equestrians
Austrian dressage riders
Olympic equestrians of Austria
Equestrians at the 2004 Summer Olympics
Sportspeople from Salzburg